Rúben Micael Freitas da Ressureição (born 19 August 1986), known as Micael, is a Portuguese former professional footballer who played as a midfielder.

He totalled 206 Primeira Liga games and 19 goals over ten seasons, representing Nacional, Porto, Braga, Paços de Ferreira and Vitória de Setúbal, winning seven major honours with the second team and a further one with the third. He also had spells in Spain, China and Israel.

A full Portuguese international since 2011, Micael was part of the squad at Euro 2012.

Club career

Early years and Nacional
Born in Câmara de Lobos, Madeira, Micael started his career with local C.F. União, making his professional debut at the age of 17. For the 2008–09 season, he moved across the island to sign with Primeira Liga club C.D. Nacional.

In that first year, in which Nacional qualified for the UEFA Europa League, Micael, almost never an undisputed starter, featured heavily, scoring notably in a 3–1 home win against S.L. Benfica on 2 May 2009. The previous month, he played for Portugal B in a 2–0 victory over Romania.

Micael started the 2009–10 campaign established in the side's starting XI, notably netting twice against FC Zenit Saint Petersburg in the Europa League's last qualifying round, first in the 4–3 home win then adding a last-minute effort in Russia for the 1–1 draw.

Porto
In mid-January 2010, FC Porto purchased 60% of Micael's playing rights for a €3 million transfer fee, signing him to a four-and-a-half-year deal and setting his release clause at €30 million. His first league game for his new club came on 30 January, where he started in the place of the suspended Raul Meireles in a 4–0 away defeat of his former team, Nacional.

In 2010–11, Micael was used sparingly by new manager André Villas-Boas. Nonetheless, he still appeared in 36 official matches and totalled 871 minutes of action (four goals, three in the Europa League campaign) as the team won the treble.

Atlético Madrid

The midfielder was then immediately loaned to fellow La Liga side Real Zaragoza, for a fee of €750,000. 23 of his appearances were as a starter, as his team narrowly avoided relegation.

Micael was loaned to S.C. Braga for 2012–13, starting the year in impressive fashion: in two games separated by only three days in late August, he scored three goals, starting with a brace in a 3–1 home victory against S.C. Beira-Mar then netting the 1–1 equaliser at Udinese Calcio in the UEFA Champions League last qualifying round. In the latter match, he rounded up his performance by converting the decisive penalty in the shootout to help his team reach the group stage for the second time in their history.

Micael continued his strong displays in the Champions League group phase, scoring the first goal in an eventual 2–0 away win over Galatasaray SK in the second round. On 20 October 2012, Atlético sold 50% of his economic rights to Braga for €3 million.

Shijiazhuang
In June 2015, Micael signed for Shijiazhuang Ever Bright FC. He made his Chinese Super League debut on 4 July, as a substitute in a goalless home draw against Changchun Yatai FC. He totalled 11 games over the season, and scored to open a 3–1 loss at Shandong Luneng Taishan F.C. on 31 October.

After his team was relegated in 2016, Micael was linked with a move to Rangers of the Scottish Premiership. On 2 February 2017, he was loaned to Maccabi Tel Aviv F.C. for the remainder of the campaign. He scored his first goal for the side on 18 March 2017, in a 3–0 home win against Bnei Sakhnin FC.

Return to Portugal
On 16 January 2018, Micael returned to Portugal's top flight, signing for F.C. Paços de Ferreira until 2021. In June, however, he switched to a one-year deal at Vitória F.C. under his former Maccabi manager Lito Vidigal.

At the end of his contract in Setúbal, Micael returned to Nacional after nine years away; the 33-year-old was their first signing, following relegation in May 2019. Two years later, having experienced another promotion and relegation, he announced his retirement.

International career
On 29 March 2011, Micael made his debut for Portugal, starting and scoring twice in a 2–0 friendly victory over Finland in Aveiro. He was chosen by coach Paulo Bento for UEFA Euro 2012 in Poland and Ukraine, but played no matches for the semi-finalists.

Career statistics

Club

International

International goals
Scores and results list Portugal's goal tally first, score column indicates score after each Micael goal.

Honours
Porto
Primeira Liga: 2010–11, 2011–12
Taça de Portugal: 2009–10, 2010–11
Supertaça Cândido de Oliveira: 2011
UEFA Europa League: 2010–11

Braga
Taça da Liga: 2012–13

References

External links

1986 births
Living people
People from Câmara de Lobos
Portuguese footballers
Madeiran footballers
Association football midfielders
Primeira Liga players
Liga Portugal 2 players
Segunda Divisão players
C.F. União players
C.D. Nacional players
FC Porto players
S.C. Braga players
F.C. Paços de Ferreira players
Vitória F.C. players
La Liga players
Atlético Madrid footballers
Real Zaragoza players
Chinese Super League players
Cangzhou Mighty Lions F.C. players
Israeli Premier League players
Maccabi Tel Aviv F.C. players
UEFA Europa League winning players
Portugal B international footballers
Portugal international footballers
UEFA Euro 2012 players
Portuguese expatriate footballers
Expatriate footballers in Spain
Expatriate footballers in China
Expatriate footballers in Israel
Portuguese expatriate sportspeople in Spain
Portuguese expatriate sportspeople in China
Portuguese expatriate sportspeople in Israel